Taseko Mountain, also known as Mount Taseko (pronounced Ta-SEE-ko) 3063 m (10049 ft), prominence: 1277 m, is one of the principal summits of the Chilcotin Ranges, part of the Pacific Ranges subdivision of the Coast Mountains of southern British Columbia.  Standing just east of the Taseko Lakes, it is the highest summit between the Taseko Lakes and the Fraser River, and the highest east of the pass between the basins of the Lord and Bridge Rivers.  North and east of Taseko Mountain the landscape drops off dramatically to the flat Chilcotin Plateau. Immediately west across Taseko Lake is Mount Tatlow, which has the same elevation as Taseko Mountain.

References

Three-thousanders of British Columbia
Landforms of the Chilcotin
Chilcotin Ranges
Lillooet Land District